CLB may refer to:

Organizations 
Canadian Language Benchmarks, the Canadian system of measuring English as a Second Language (ESL) proficiency levels.
China Labour Bulletin, a non-governmental organization that promotes and defends workers’ rights in the People's Republic of China
 Church Lads' Brigade, from 1891 to 1978, a predecessor of the Church Lads' and Church Girls' Brigade, a Church of England youth organisation
 Columbia Lighthouse for the Blind, an organization founded to help the blind or visually impaired population of the greater Washington, D.C. region

Other uses 
 Certified Lover Boy, a 2021 album by Canadian rapper Drake
 Combat logistics battalion, a unit in the United States Marine Corps
 Configurable logic block, a component of a field-programmable gate array